Algarrobo del Águila is a village and rural locality (municipality) in La Pampa Province in Argentina.  It is the capital of the Chical Có Department, 171 km from Santa Rosa, the provincial capital of the La Pampa province, and 693 km from Buenos Aires. It is located on Provincial Route 10 and National Route 151.

Population
Algarrobo del Águila had 641 inhabitants (INDEC, 2001), which represented an increase of 36.67% over the previous population of 469 inhabitants (INDEC, 1991) from the previous census.

Toponym
There are two variants of whether there was a locust (algarrobo) or a caldén, in front of the police station. The Águila is a white-breasted eagle.

History
Algarrobo was a land occupied by native peoples for more than six thousand years. Indeed, during that time it was a "white desert". By 1870 the Argentine Army had expelled the last native. Up to 1876, the cacique Juan José Catriel lived with his people in the region.

External links
 Population data
 Geographical coordinates
 IFAM federal site
 Provincial site

References

Populated places in La Pampa Province